Jaime Gil da Costa (born July 29, 1957), better known as Gil Brother, Brother Away, Away de Petrópolis, Away Nilzer or simply as Away, is a Brazilian actor, humorist, dancer and YouTuber. Known for his quirky, no-nonsense demeanor, acerbic sense of humor, and frequent reliance on foul language and malapropisms, he reached fame during his stint as a member of the comedy troupe Hermes & Renato from 2002 to 2008.

Biography
Jaime Gil da Costa was born in Petrópolis, Rio de Janeiro on July 29, 1957 to machinist Augusto Carneiro da Costa and housewife Vânia Maria Pacheco Costa. Raised in poverty from childhood, he had to work to make ends meet – initially selling sweets made by his mother in the streets, and later as a flanelinha. By 1985, Gil had acquired a passion for dancing; he was inspired by soul and funk artists such as Little Richard and James Brown which he grew up listening to, and he began performing in commercial spaces and bus stations for money. He frequently clashed with the police and ended up being arrested multiple times. Due to his tendency to get into brawls, he suffered a retinal detachment in his left eye which made it blind. It was around this time when he received his nickname "Brother Away", because of his typical shouts of "Away!" as he danced. Later, he turned this into his catchphrase.

In 2002, the comedy troupe Hermes & Renato, which Gil had long been acquainted with, invited him to be a member. Initially, he played one-time characters. He left the troupe in 2008 citing creative differences as well as contractual and payment issues. His allegations would later be rebutted by Hermes & Renato (then called "Banana Mecânica") in 2011. After eventually making amends, Gil later appeared in many runs of the troupe's theater play Uma Tentativa de Show beginning in 2019.

Following his experience with Hermes & Renato, Gil announced he no longer intended to appear in media, but in 2011 the video production company Jigsaw Produções invited him to open his own YouTube channel, the "Canal Away". Jigsaw ended their contract with Gil in 2014 and deleted his channel, alleging he failed to fulfill certain obligations. The following year, Gil opened a new channel on his own.

Gil made his debut as a film actor in 2014, playing a beggar in the parody film Copa de Elite. In 2018, he made a guest appearance in the music video for the song "Rodei o Mundo" by the rock band Strike.

In 2020, he narrated a McDonald's commercial promoting their new McShakes.

References

External links
 Gil Brother's channel on YouTube
 

1957 births
Living people
Brazilian male film actors
Brazilian male television actors
21st-century Brazilian male actors
Brazilian male dancers
Brazilian humorists
Brazilian YouTubers
Afro-Brazilian male actors
People from Petrópolis